Ludgershall is the name of more than one place.  The name is Anglo Saxon in origin, meaning 'nook with a trapping spear'.

In the United Kingdom:

Ludgershall, Buckinghamshire, England
Ludgershall, Wiltshire, England
Ludgershall (UK Parliament constituency), former parliamentary borough